CEF may refer to for:

Military
 Canadian Expeditionary Force, in the First World War
 Chinese Expeditionary Force, during the Burma Campaign of World War II
 Czech Air Force, ICAO airline code
 Westover Air Reserve Base in Massachusetts

Finance and economics
 Caixa Econômica Federal, a Brazilian bank
 Closed-end fund, a collective investment model
 Connecting Europe Facility, a European Union fund

Technology
 Chromium Embedded Framework, an open-source software framework
 Cisco Express Forwarding, a switching technology
 Cluster of Excellence Frankfurt Macromolecular Complexes, a nanotechnology institution

Transport 
 Chapel-en-le-Frith railway station, in Derbyshire, England
 Westover Metropolitan Airport, in Massachusetts

Other uses
 Bishops' Conference of France
 Central Experimental Farm, Ottawa, Canada
 Child Evangelism Fellowship, an international Christian nonprofit organization
 Common European Framework of Reference for Languages
 Conseil des écoles fransaskoises, a school board in Saskatchewan, Canada
 Conservative European Forum, a British political organisation